James Henry Mussen Campbell, 1st Baron Glenavy  (4 April 1851 – 22 March 1931) was an Irish lawyer, politician in the British Parliament and later in the Oireachtas of the Irish Free State. He was also Lord Chancellor of Ireland.

Barrister and Judge

He was born in Dublin and educated at  Dr. Stacpoole's School in Kingstown (now Dún Laoghaire) and Trinity College Dublin, graduating BA in 1874. After being called to the Irish bar in 1878, Campbell was made an Irish Queen's Counsel in 1892 and six years later was elected Irish Unionist MP for the Dublin seat of St. Stephen's Green. The following year he was called to the English bar, and in February 1902 was elected a Bencher of Gray's Inn. Campbell became Solicitor-General for Ireland in 1901, and in 1903 he was elected to the House of Commons as representative for Dublin University. He was made the country's Attorney General in 1905, being appointed an Irish Privy Counsellor, and in 1916 became Lord Chief Justice of Ireland.

Considerable controversy surrounded the efforts to appoint him a judge: the initial proposal to appoint him Lord Chancellor of Ireland met with fierce resistance from Irish Nationalists, and great efforts were made to find another position for him. It appears that Baron Atkinson was asked to retire from the House of Lords but refused. Pressure was then put on the Lord Chief Justice of Ireland, Richard Cherry, who was seriously ill, to step down. Cherry despite his failing health was initially reluctant to do so, but eventually agreed to retire in December 1916. Maurice Healy in his memoirs remarks that Campbell was considered the finest Irish barrister of his time, with the possible exception of Edward Carson, but as a judge, he was somewhat fretful and impatient, with a tendency (admittedly not uncommon in judges) to interrupt counsel.

Irish War of Independence

Campbell was created a baronet in 1917, and the following year was appointed Lord Chancellor of Ireland. During the Irish War of Independence, his position was somewhat ambiguous. As head of the Irish judiciary, he was naturally expected by the British Government to do all in his power to uphold British rule; but as his later career showed he was not opposed to the existence of the Irish Free State and was quite willing to play a role in the new Government. This pragmatic attitude naturally infuriated the British administration, some of whom regarded it as a betrayal. Mark Sturgis, the Dublin Castle official whose diaries give a vivid picture of the last years of British rule, condemned Campbell bitterly as a coward who "does nothing and apparently thinks of nothing but the best way to show Sinn Féin that he is neutral and passive". Noted Irish historian R. B. McDowell has commented in relation to this and similar criticism from his successor as Lord Chancellor, Sir John Ross, that neither man intended to stay and live in Southern Ireland, Ross moving via London to his country house in county Tyrone (inherited from his father-in-law), Sturgis safely back to England.

On relinquishing office in 1921 he was ennobled as Baron Glenavy, of Milltown in the County of Dublin.

First Chairman of the Irish Free State Seanad
In 1922 he was nominated to the new Free State Seanad by W. T. Cosgrave, and was elected by almost all of his fellow senators as its first chairman (Cathaoirleach) on 12 December 1922. This was in the midst of the Irish Civil War and shortly after his appointment his family home in Kimmage, Dublin was burnt by the anti-Treaty IRA, as part of their campaign against the representatives of the new state.

After the 1925 Seanad election he was again elected as chairman on 9 December 1925 by a vote of 40–12. He did not seek re-election when his term in the Seanad expired in 1928.

The Courts of Justice Act 1924
In January 1923, Glenavy chaired the Judicial Committee appointed to advise the Executive Council of the Irish Free State on the creation of a new courts system for the Irish Free State. His recommendations were implemented in the Courts of Justice Act 1924 which largely created the Irish courts system as it currently exists. This replaced, and indeed replicated the existing court system as established by the Government of Ireland Act 1920. The Dáil Courts were declared to have been illegal, but their outstanding 'judgements' were conferred with legal standing by a separate Act of the Oireachtas. Glenavy clashed with another member of the committee, Hugh Kennedy, soon to become the first Chief Justice of Ireland, who was in favour of far more radical changes than those recommended by Glenavy and a majority of the committee. Political  differences were compounded  by the  fact that the two men disliked each other personally.

Lord Glenavy died in Dublin in 1931 and was buried in the city's Mount Jerome Cemetery.

Family
His parents were Colonel William Mussen Campbell and Delia Poole Graham, the daughter of Henry Francis Graham of Newtown Abbey, County Kildare. William and Delia lived at Prospect House, Terenure, County Dublin. His paternal grandfather's family was from Glenavy and Magheragall in County Antrim.

His son Charles married the Irish artist Beatrice Elvery, whose family founded Elverys Sports.

His grandson, under the name Patrick Campbell, was a noted satirist in the early years of television. He was a longtime captain of one of the panels in the BBC gameshow Call My Bluff against British comedy writer Frank Muir. Another grandson, Michael Campbell, later the 4th and last Lord Glenavy was the author of the work of gay literature, Lord Dismiss Us.

Arms

Notes

External links
 

A portrait of Lord Glenavy

1851 births
1931 deaths
Alumni of Trinity College Dublin
Glenavy, James Campbell, 1st Baron
Members of the Privy Council of Ireland
Burials at Mount Jerome Cemetery and Crematorium
Irish Unionist Party MPs
UK MPs 1895–1900
UK MPs 1900–1906
UK MPs 1906–1910
UK MPs 1910
UK MPs 1910–1918
UK MPs who were granted peerages
Members of the 1922 Seanad
Members of the 1925 Seanad
Cathaoirligh of Seanad Éireann
Politicians from County Dublin
Members of the Parliament of the United Kingdom for Dublin University
Members of the Parliament of the United Kingdom for County Dublin constituencies (1801–1922)
Solicitors-General for Ireland
Attorneys-General for Ireland
Lords chief justice of Ireland
Independent members of Seanad Éireann
Barons created by George V